The President Guard Regiment (PGR) is a military unit under the Executive Office of the President of Bangladesh. It is located at Dhaka Cantonment, Banga Bhaban and Ganabhaban. It provides military support for all security functions; including presidential travel, general medical support, emergency medical services, and hospitality services. The PGR is headed by the Military Secretary to the President and the Commander, President Guard Regiment. The regiment was created by President Ziaur Rahman in 1976. It was originally designated as the Presidential Security Force. The PSF was restructured and upgraded to full regimental status by President Hussain Muhammad Ershad in 1982 and the new title of President Guard Regiment was adopted.

History 
The "predecessor" of the regiment was the President's Bodyguard of Pakistan, which was itself descended from the colonial-era Governor General's Bodyguard. This role was discontinued in 1971 with Bangladeshi independence but the regiment was established in 1976 and restructured in 1982, and charged with ensuring the physical security of the President, visiting heads of state and high-ranking dignitaries.

Mission and function 

The force is charged with providing security for the President of Bangladesh, the Prime Minister of Bangladesh, their immediate family members and any other VIPs designated as such by both enacted legislation and government decisions.

All presidential aides-de-camp are assigned under this office. Visiting spouses of foreign Heads of State, Heads of Government and dignitaries also receive their protection.

The commander of the President Guard Regiment is an army major general with the designation of Military Secretary to the President; the equivalent of the U.S. Director of the White House Military Office. The commander reports directly to the president.

The commandant is normally a Brigadier General with responsibility for the day-to-day administration of the regiment.

The regiment consists of eight platoons, each commanded by either a major or a captain. The regiment's uniform varies slightly from that of other units of the Bangladesh Army. Its members are authorised to carry firearms when in uniform, even during peacetime.

See also 
 Governor General's Bodyguard
 President's Bodyguard (India)
 President's Bodyguard (Pakistan)
 Household Cavalry (United Kingdom)

References

Regiments of Bangladesh
Protective security units
Guards regiments